Guy Eckstine is an artist manager and record producer, known for his tenure as A&R executive at Verve Records in the 1990s. With jazz keyboardist Herbie Hancock, Eckstine co-produced the Hancock album The New Standard.

After Verve, Eckstine was senior vice president at MP3.com, then in 2001 he started his own artist development company. Eckstine is the president and founder of Iconique Music Group, an artist management company.

Family
Eckstine was born in 1956 to American jazz/pop singer Billy Eckstine and his wife Carolle Drake, an actress and model. Eckstine's siblings include four older brothers and two younger sisters. The family eventually settled in Encino, California, where Eckstine was raised. His brother Ed later served as president of Mercury Records.

Music industry
Eckstine's early career was as a freelance/touring drummer involved in various musical projects for his father, Quincy Jones, Count Basie, James Ingram, Eddy Grant and more. In the late 1980s, he was a creative manager for Virgin Music Label & Artist Services, developing songwriters. He worked for Columbia Records starting in 1990, leading the West Coast division of A&R, developing Black artists. In 1991 he helmed A&R for the jazz label Verve Records, during a period when Verve was praised for its creativity. For Verve Forecast Records, among others, Eckstine signed, Herbie Hancock, saxophonist Wayne Shorter, and keyboardist Jeff Lorber. Trumpeter Chris Botti credited Eckstine for his decision to sign with Verve. Eckstine also inked an American record deal for British acid jazz group Incognito. Eckstine occasionally played drums or percussion on the albums he produced, and he programmed drum machine rhythms for Porter's Straight to the Point album which became a best-seller in smooth jazz. After Porter died in 1996, Eckstine produced his final album, For Art's Sake, playing drums, keyboards and mixing.

References

External links
 [ Guy Eckstine] at AllMusic

Living people
American music industry executives
University of California, Los Angeles alumni
1956 births